FK Kravari is a football club based in the village Kravari near Bitola, North Macedonia. They are currently competing in the Macedonian Third League (Southwest Division)

History
The club was founded in 1944.

References

External links
Club info at MacedonianFootball 
Football Federation of Macedonia 

Kravari
Association football clubs established in 1944
1944 establishments in the Socialist Republic of Macedonia
FK